The Big Bluff is a 1955 film noir directed by W. Lee Wilder and starring John Bromfield, Martha Vickers and Robert Hutton.

Plot
The suave Don Juan Ricardo "Rick" De Villa (John Bromfield) and his married lover Fritzi Darvel would like to take off together, but his lack of money prevents them from doing so. A chance encounter introduces Rick to the young but terminally ill socialite Valerie Bancroft (Martha Vickers), in whom Rick sees the solution to his predicament. Rick sweeps her off her feet and they soon marry, although Valerie's entourage is suspicious of him. Rick then proceeds to try to bring about Valerie's demise so he can inherit her wealth and live the good life with Fritzi.

Cast
 John Bromfield as Ricardo 'Rick' De Villa
 Martha Vickers as Valerie Bancroft
 Robert Hutton as Dr. Peter Kirk
 Rosemarie Stack as Fritzi Darvel
 Eve Miller as Marsha Jordan
 Max Palmer as Detective Sgt. John Fullmer
 Eddie Bee as Don Darvel
 Robert Bice as Dr. Tom Harrison
 Pierre Watkin as Jim Winthrop
 Beal Wong as Art Dealer
 Rusty Wescoatt as Husky Detective at Finale
 Mitchell Kowal as Coroner
 Jack Daly as Master of Ceremonies

See also
List of American films of 1955

References

External links
 
 
 
 
 The Big Bluff information site and DVD review at DVD Beaver (includes images)
 

1955 films
1955 crime drama films
American crime drama films
American black-and-white films
Film noir
Films directed by W. Lee Wilder
Films set in California
United Artists films
1950s English-language films
1950s American films